"Sweet Thing" is a song by Northern Irish singer-songwriter Van Morrison, released on his second studio album Astral Weeks (1968). It was on the first side of the album, that was under the heading: In the Beginning.  The song was later used in 1971 as the American B-side to Morrison's single "Blue Money".

Recording and composition
"Sweet Thing" was written by Morrison, aged c.22–23, after he had met his future wife Janet while on tour in the US in 1966 and during the year of separation after he returned to Belfast.

It was recorded during the last Astral Weeks session on 15 October 1968, at Century Sound Studios in New York City with Lewis Merenstein as producer. It is the only song on the album that looks forward instead of backward:
You shall take me strongly in your arms again
And I will not remember that I ever felt the pain

Van Morrison described the song to Ritchie Yorke: "Sweet Thing' is another romantic song.  It contemplates gardens and things like that...wet with rain.  It's a romantic love ballad  not about anybody in particular but about a feeling."

Acclaim
The song was listed as No. 415 on the All Time 885 Greatest Songs compiled in 2004 by WXPN from listener's votes. Mark Seymour on The Guardian called it "the most perfect song of all time".

Other releases
"Sweet Thing" is the only song from Astral Weeks included on the 1990 compilation album The Best of Van Morrison. It was also featured on Morrison's album Astral Weeks Live at the Hollywood Bowl, released in 2009 to celebrate forty years since Astral Weeks was first released

Appearance in the media
The song is featured two times in the 2012 movie The Five-Year Engagement. It is playing when the two main characters first meet. It is also featured in its entirety during the ending of the movie Moonlight Mile, written and directed by Brad Silberling. The song can also be heard in the final scene of the AMC television show Preacher during the suicide of the Vampire, Cassidy. It provides the title and closing music for the 2020 movie Sweet Thing by Alexandre Rockwell.

Personnel
Van Morrison – vocals, acoustic guitar
Jay Berliner – classical guitar
Richard Davis – double bass
Connie Kay – drums
John Payne – flute
Warren Smith Jr. – triangle
Larry Fallon – string arrangements

Covers
The Waterboys covered the song on their 1988 album Fisherman's Blues, which also interpolates the Beatles' "Blackbird".
German indie band Flowerpornoes did a cover on their 1996 album Ich & Ich.
Jeff Buckley's 1993 recorded but posthumously released (in 2004) live album Live at Sin-é (Legacy Edition) includes a live extended version. 
Shana Morrison included a cover of "Sweet Thing" on her debut album Caledonia (1999). 
Ezio covered it on the album Live at the Shepherds Bush Empire. 
Joe Louis Walker included a version on his album Pasa Tiempo (2002).  
The 4 of Us covered it at the Astral Weeks Revisited concert in Belfast on 5 January 2008 to mark the 40th anniversary of Astral Weeks.

References

Sources
Heylin, Clinton (2003). Can You Feel the Silence? Van Morrison: A New Biography,  Chicago Review Press 
Yorke, Ritchie (1975). Into The Music, London: Charisma Books,

External links
[ Allmusic Review: Sweet Thing]

1968 songs
Van Morrison songs
Jeff Buckley songs
Songs written by Van Morrison
Song recordings produced by Lewis Merenstein